WKW may refer to:

Wer-kennt-wen, popular German social networking site
WKW Wilk, modern sniper rifle 
Wong Kar-wai, Chinese film director